"Zillionaire" is a song by American rapper Flo Rida, released on July 29, 2016, in the United States. Remixes followed September 16, 2016.

Track listings
Digital download
 "Zillionaire" – 3:52

Digital download – remixes
 "Zillionaire" (Jaykode Remix) – 3:34
 "Zillionaire" (Riot Ten Remix) – 4:06
 "Zillionaire" (Gianni Remix) – 3:09

Music video
The official music video was released December 6, 2016. A second music video, which takes place in Dubai Directed by Alex Acosta, was released July 13, 2017.

Other media
The song was featured in the trailer for Masterminds, a film starring Zach Galifianakis, Kristen Wiig, Leslie Jones, Owen Wilson, and Jason Sudeikis.

Charts

References

External links

2016 singles
2016 songs
Atlantic Records singles
Flo Rida songs
Songs written by Flo Rida
Songs written by Breyan Isaac
Songs written by Johan Carlsson (musician)
Songs written by Ross Golan
Pop-rap songs